is a Japanese animator, storyboard artist, and director.

Anime involved in
Metal Fighter Miku: Key Animation
Tenchi Universe: Key Animation (ep 12)
Slayers Gorgeous: Assistant Animation Director
Digimon: The Movie: Key Animation
Shrine of the Morning Mist: Animation director (ep 5)
Da Capo: Second Season: Director
Galaxy Angel A: Animation director
Galaxy Angel Z: Animation director
Otoboku: Maidens Are Falling For Me!: Director
Nanatsuiro Drops: Storyboard (eps 4,8), Episode Director (ep 8)
Nogizaka Haruka no Himitsu: Director
Nogizaka Haruka no Himitsu: Purezza: Director
Kissxsis: Director 
Fortune Arterial: Akai Yakusoku: Director
R-15: Director
Nakaimo - My Sister Is Among Them!: Director
Locodol: Director
Pandora in the Crimson Shell: Ghost Urn: Director
Kin-iro Mosaic: Thank You!!: Director

External links

Anime directors
Year of birth missing (living people)
Living people